The 2015 Netherlands Women's Sevens was the third edition of the Netherlands Women's Sevens as part of the Women's World Series. It was held over the weekend of 22–23 May 2015 at NRCA Stadium, Amsterdam, as the sixth and final event of the 2014–15 series.

Format
The teams are drawn into three pools of four teams each. Each team plays every other team in their pool once. The top two teams from each pool advance to the Cup/Plate brackets along with the top two third place teams. The rest of the teams go to the Bowl bracket.

Teams

Pool stage

Pool A

Pool B

Pool C

Knockout stage

Bowl

Plate

Cup

References

External links
Fixtures

2014–15
2014–15 World Rugby Women's Sevens Series
rugby union
2015 in women's rugby union
2015 rugby sevens competitions